Chleby Zoo (officially Zoologická zahrada Chleby) is a zoo in Chleby in the Central Bohemian Region of the Czech Republic. It is located close to the town of Nymburk.

With an area of only 0.8 hectares belonged among the smallest in the country, but in 2008 3.6 hectares was added, when the zoo bought land just across the road of the zoo. In 2008 was started a giant freshwater aquarium called the Pavilion of the Elbe.

External links

References

Zoos in the Czech Republic
Nymburk District
Buildings and structures in the Central Bohemian Region
Zoos established in 1997
1997 establishments in the Czech Republic
20th-century architecture in the Czech Republic